Wayne Day Family Field at Carter–Finley Stadium is home to the NC State Wolfpack football team. It was opened in 1966 and has grown to a seating capacity of 56,919 seats.

History
As early as the 1950s, State was looking to replace its on-campus facility, Riddick Stadium.  The concrete-and-wood stadium had been built in 1907 and was showing its age.  It never held more than 23,000 seats (14,000 permanent) at any time.  Partly because of this, many of longtime coach Earle Edwards' teams played more games on the road than at home.  At Edwards' urging, school officials began a concerted effort to build a more modern facility

The new stadium finally opened in 1966.  It was originally named Carter Stadium, in honor of Harry C. & Wilbert J. "Nick" Carter, both graduates of the university. They were major contributors to the original building of the stadium. The name of Albert E. Finley, another major contributor to the university, was added in September 1979.

While located on University land, the stadium is a few miles to the west of the academic campus on Trinity Road, just off Hillsborough Street.

Carter–Finley Stadium's season tickets have been sold out for nine straight years.

Carter–Finley Stadium has the smallest clearance between the stands and the sidelines of any stadium in the ACC.

Retired numbers displayed on the west facade of Carter–Finley Stadium include those of Roman Gabriel (18), Torry Holt (81), Philip Rivers (17), Bill Yoest (63), Dennis Byrd (77), Dick Christy (40), Jim Ritcher (51), Ted Brown (23), Mario Williams and Bradley Chubb (9); and Russell Wilson (16).  Carter–Finley also displays banners from NC State's bowl appearances which include the Gator Bowl, Peach Bowl, and Liberty Bowl.

Renovations
Prior to the 2001 season, the university began a program of modernization of the stadium by enclosing the southern end zone with seats, and the state-of-the-art Murphy Center (named for Wendell Murphy) was built behind it. Following the 2004 football season, Carter–Finley was again expanded with the completion of the "Vaughn Towers", a complex of luxury boxes, club seats, and media facilities which opened for the 2005 football season.

For the 2006 season, a new north end zone grandstand was added consisting of 5,730 new chairback, bench, and handicap-accessible seating with another 1,630 permanent bleacher seats built underneath the video scoreboard making Carter–Finley a bowl and giving it a capacity of 57,583 spectators. Additional upgrades to the stadium included a new north end zone plaza with concession stands and the addition of two video screens in each corner of the south end zone.

Notable events

Concerts

Soccer

On July 28, 2011, the World Football Challenge held an exhibition match between Juventus of Italy's Serie A, and Guadalajara Chivas of Mexico's Primera Division at the stadium.

Hockey 

The National Hockey League announced on February 15, 2020, that the Carolina Hurricanes would host a Stadium Series game at Carter–Finley Stadium on February 20, 2021. The NHL announced on December 23, 2020, that the game had been postponed. On February 4, 2022, the NHL announced the game would take place in February 2023.  On March 3, 2022, the NHL announced the game would take place on February 18, 2023, between the Hurricanes and the Washington Capitals.

The Hurricanes defeated the Capitals 4-1 with 56,961 fans in attendance.

Following the stadium series game, NC State's club hockey program, the IcePack, defeated the North Carolina Tar Heels 7-3 in front of an estimated 24,000 fans.

Other Events
Carter-Finley served as the primary venue for the 1999 Special Olympics World Summer Games from June 26 to July 4, 1999.
Carter-Finley will serve as a host venue for the 2029 Summer World University Games.

See also
 List of NCAA Division I FBS football stadiums

References

External links

 

College football venues
NC State Wolfpack football venues
Sports venues in Raleigh, North Carolina
Sports venues completed in 1966
1966 establishments in North Carolina
American football venues in North Carolina
Soccer venues in North Carolina